Plymouth Guildhall is located on Guildhall Square in the city centre of Plymouth, Devon, England.  It is a Grade II listed building.

History 
The first guildhall can be dated back to the 15th century and is believed to have been located in the Old Town; it was replaced by a second guildhall which was erected in the Southside Street / Woolster Street area in 1440. A third guildhall was built in the Jacobean style at the junction of High Street and Whimple Street in 1607; this was demolished to allow a fourth guildhall, designed by a Mr Eveleigh, to be built and completed in 1800.

The foundation stone for the current building, which was the fifth, was laid by the mayor, William Luscombe, on 28 July 1870. It was designed by Norman and Hine of Plymouth with artistic direction by Edward William Godwin in the Gothic Revival style and built by Messrs Call and Pethick. The building was officially opened by the Prince of Wales on 13 August 1874. Internally, the principal room was the Great Hall: a pipe organ, made by Henry Willis & Sons, was installed in the hall and the first recital given on 22 October 1878.

The building's role increased in importance when the Three Towns of Plymouth, Devonport and Stonehouse amalgamated in 1914 and municipal functions were transferred to the expanded City of Plymouth.

The guildhall and the surrounding buildings were reduced to shells on the night of 21 March 1941 during the Plymouth Blitz of the Second World War. Paton Watson and Patrick Abercombie envisaged a Beaux Arts city which would have involved the demolition of the Guildhall: their proposal was rejected by one council vote in 1951. Following the restoration of the building, which involved a new roof, entrances and interior, the building was re-opened by Field Marshal the Viscount Montgomery of Alamein on 24 September 1959.

Although the City Treasurer's Department remained in the east wing of the guildhall, the council continued to need more space and most departments moved to Plymouth Civic Centre, located a short distance to the west of the guildhall, in 1962.

Description
The Great Hall is currently a multi-purpose venue, hosting a range of events throughout the year including graduations, award ceremonies, weddings and civil ceremonies. Fourteen stained glass windows, designed by Frederick Halford Coventry (1905-1997), line the sides of the hall and depict notable moments in Plymouth's history. A large 19th century tapestry, made at Gobelins Manufactory, hangs at the front and depicts Raphael's vision of the "Miraculous Drought of Fishes". Famous performers in the hall have included the rock band Status Quo in March 1973, the rock band Queen in March 1974 and the European Union Chamber Orchestra conducted by Julian Lloyd Webber in April 2009.

References 

Buildings and structures in Plymouth, Devon
Guildhalls in the United Kingdom
City and town halls in Devon
Government buildings completed in 1874